Bandlamotu is a village in Bollapalle mandal, located in Guntur district of Indian state of Andhra Pradesh.

References 

Villages in Guntur district